Daniel Vance Reynolds (November 26, 1919 – February 18, 2007) was a shortstop/second baseman in Major League Baseball who played for the Chicago White Sox during the 1945 season. He was born in Stony Point, North Carolina.

Reynolds, nicknamed "Squirrel", was a .167 hitter (12-for-72) with six runs and four RBI in 29 games played, including two doubles, one triple, and one stolen base. He did not hit a home run. As an infielder, he collected a .962 fielding percentage in 25 games (14 at shortstop).

Reynolds died in Statesville, North Carolina at age 87.

Sources

Chicago White Sox players
Major League Baseball infielders
Baseball players from North Carolina
1919 births
2007 deaths
Martinsville Manufacturers players
Statesville Owls players
Norfolk Tars players
Atlanta Crackers players
Newark Bears (IL) players
Shreveport Sports players
Burlington Bees (Carolina League) players
Little Rock Travelers players
Shelby Farmers players
Shelby Clippers players
People from Stony Point, North Carolina